Fruit fly may refer to:

Organisms
 Drosophilidae, a family of small flies, including:
 Drosophila, the genus of small fruit flies and vinegar flies
 Drosophila melanogaster or common fruit fly
 Drosophila suzukii or Asian fruit fly
 Tephritidae, a family of large flies
 Bactrocera cucurbitae or melon fly
 Bactrocera oleae or olive fruit fly
 Bactrocera tryoni or Queensland fruit fly
 Vidalia (fly), a genus

Other uses
 Fruit Fly (film), 2009 film directed by H. P. Mendoza
 , LGBT slang with a meaning similar to fag hag

Animal common name disambiguation pages